George "Teddy" Pakos (born August 14, 1952 in Victoria, British Columbia) is a former Canadian international soccer player.  His goals were crucial in Canada qualifying for the FIFA World Cup finals in 1986.

Club career

Pakos won Rookie of the Year honours in the final Pacific Coast League season, helping Victoria West United finish second overall in the 1972-73 league standings. He later played for Victoria's London Boxing Club (which later became the VAA) and won Canada Soccer's The Challenge Trophy in 1975. He began work at the same time as a water-meter technician for the city of Victoria, a job he continued for over 25 years.  The third son of Polish immigrants, George's father Zenon played professionally in Poland before being displaced by the war. Pakos did play briefly professionally in the Western Soccer Alliance in 1985 with the Victoria Riptides and in the Canadian Soccer League with the Victoria Vistas in 1989.

International career

Spotted by coach Bob Bearpark while playing for the Vancouver Island Selects amateur team, Pakos made his debut with the Olympic team at age 30. He also played for Bearpark in two Olympic qualifying matches in 1983 against Bermuda, scoring once in each game. He was however left off the team that reached the quarterfinals of the Olympics.

The midfielder Pakos scored 5 times in 23 'A' internationals, all of which he earned from age 31 on.  In 1986 FIFA World Cup qualification as a 33-year-old who had been cut from the team after the first round of qualifying, Pakos was recalled and scored the lone goal in a vital away win at Honduras. He also scored the first goal in a 2–1 home victory against Honduras that clinched Canada's berth in their only finals appearance. Pakos came on for the last 21 minutes of Canada's third match in the finals versus the Soviet Union in his final full international appearance.

International goals
Scores and results list Canada's goal tally first.

Post-retirement

Pakos was head coach of V.A.A.'s Division 2 men's team of the Vancouver Island Soccer League in 2005–06.

In 2001, Pakos was inducted into the Greater Victoria Sports Hall of Fame.

Honours and achievements

Victoria London Boxing Club
Canadian Amateur Championship (Challenge Trophy) winner (1975)

Individual
Pacific Coast League Rookie of the Year, 1972–73
Greater Victoria Sports Hall of Fame, 2001
BC Soccer Award of Merit, 2004
VISL Team of the Half Century, 2015

References

External links

1952 births
Living people
1986 FIFA World Cup players
Canada men's international soccer players
Canadian soccer players
Canadian Soccer League (1987–1992) players
Association football forwards
Canadian people of Polish descent
Soccer players from Victoria, British Columbia
Western Soccer Alliance players
Victoria Riptides players
Victoria Vistas players
CONCACAF Championship-winning players